Das ist nicht die ganze Wahrheit... ("That's not the whole truth...") is the fourth album by German rock band Die Ärzte. It was the last studio album before the band's 5-year hiatus. The title of the album is a line spoken by William Shatner in the film Airplane II: The Sequel.

"♀" (or "Schwanz ab" [Dick off]) is kind of a hidden track and not listed on the back cover, also, the lyrics are not in the booklet (it is still a separate track).

Track listing
 "Ohne dich (die Welt könnte so schön sein...)" [Without you (the world could be so beautiful...)] - 2:49
 "Baby, ich tu's" [Baby, I'll do it] - 3:00
 "Komm zurück" [Come back] - 3:33
 "Wilde Welt" [Wild world] - 2:51
 "Westerland" - 3:41
 "Ich will dich" [I want you] - 2:18
 "Elke" - 3:22
 "Ich ess' Blumen" [I eat flowers] - 3:44
 "Außerirdische" [Aliens] - 2:45
 "Die Siegerin" [Winner] - 3:10
 "Bitte, bitte" [Please please] - 3:17
 "Popstar" - 3:12
 "Gute Zeit" [Good time] - 3:23
 "♀" - 1:49

Singles
1988: "Ich ess' Blumen"
1988: "Westerland"
1989: "Bitte bitte"

Musicians
Farin Urlaub - guitar, bass guitar, vocals
Bela Felsenheimer - drums, vocals

Charts

References

1988 albums
Die Ärzte albums
German-language albums